The 1876–77 Scottish Districts season is a record of all the  rugby union matches for Scotland's district teams.

It includes the Inter-City fixture between Glasgow District and Edinburgh District; and the East of Scotland District versus West of Scotland District trial match.

History

The East of Scotland v West of Scotland trial match was kept as an annual event.

The Inter-City fixture was cut to one annual fixture.

Results

Inter-City

Glasgow District: J. S. Carrick (Glasgow Academicals), M. Cross (Glasgow Academicals), A. McGeoch (West of Scotland), J. Neilson (Glasgow Academicals), W. H. Little (West of Scotland), D. H. Watson (Glasgow Academicals) [captain], J. Junor (Glasgow Academicals), A. T. Arthur (Glasgow Academicals), T. Chalmers (Glasgow Academicals), W. Morton (St. Vincent), W. B. Russell (West of Scotland), J. Cochrane (West of Scotland), H. Napier (West of Scotland), R. A. Ker (Glasgow University), T. M. Morrison (Glasgow University)

Edinburgh District: John Smith (Edinburgh University), G. A. Scott (Royal HSFP), J. Rutherford (Royal HSFP), R. Johnston (Edinburgh Academicals), E. I. Pocock (Edinburgh Wanderers), A. G. Petrie (Royal HSFP) [captain], R. B. Murrie (Royal HSFP), Gussie Graham (Edinburgh Academicals), G. Finlay (Edinburgh Academicals), T. Torrie (Edinburgh Academicals), G. Macleod (Edinburgh Academicals), C. Hawkins (Edinburgh Wanderers), C. Villar (Edinburgh Wanderers), R. G. Strong (Edinburgh Wanderers), G. Budd (Edinburgh Wanderers)

Other Scottish matches

East of Scotland District: J. Norrie (Abertay), back; 2, H. Stiven (Dundee), half-back ; 3, W. Dick, half-back ; 4, M. Wright (Red Cross), quarter ; 5, G. Auldjo (St Andrews University), quarter ; 6, A. Stiven (Dundee), [captain] ; 7, E. Hill (Dundee) ; 8, D. R. Irvine (Aberdeen Rangers) ; 9, G. Cruden (Aberdeen Rangers) ; 10, D. M. Barrow (St Andrews University) ; 11, E. Morrison (St Andrews University) ; 12, L. C. Auldjo (Abertay) ; 13, Newman (Abertay) ; 14, W. Johnston (Red Cross), 15, A. B Storrier (Red Cross).  

Edinburgh District: H. H. Johnston (Collegiate F.P),  R. Johnston (Edinburgh Academicals), J. C. Montgomerie (Edinburgh Wanderers), George Paterson (Edinburgh Academicals), E. I. Pocock (Edinburgh Wanderers), A. G. Petrie [captain] (Royal HSFP), J. Morrison, (Royal HSFP), R. W. Irvine (Edinburgh Academicals), Gussie Graham (Edinburgh Academicals) T. Torrie (Edinburgh Academicals) G. Finlay (Edinburgh Academicals) T. Tod (Edinburgh Academicals) 13, C. Villar (Edinburgh Wanderers), R. G. Strong (Edinburgh Wanderers), Nat Brewis (Edinburgh Institution F.P.)

East of Scotland District: Henry Halcro Johnston (Collegiate), J. Smith (Edinburgh University), J. V. Rutherford (Royal HSFP), E. I. Pocock (Edinburgh Wanderers), George Paterson (Edinburgh Academicals), A. G. Petrie (Royal HSFP) [captain], J. O. Morrison (Royal HSFP), R. B. Murrie (Royal HSFP), Gussie Graham (Edinburgh Academicals), T. Torrie (Edinburgh Academicals), G. Finlay (Edinburgh Academicals), J. Reid (Edinburgh Wanderers), C. Villar (Edinburgh Wanderers), R. G. Strong (Edinburgh Wanderers), G. Budd (Edinburgh Wanderers).

West of Scotland District: J. S. Carrick (Glasgow Academicals), M. Cross (Glasgow Academicals), R. C. Mackenzie (Glasgow Academicals), D. H. Watson (Glasgow Academicals), J. Little (West of Scotland), J. H. Smith (Glasgow Academicals), J. E. Junor (Glasgow Academicals), A. T. Arthur (Glasgow Academicals),  H. Napier (West of Scotland), J. Cochrane (West of Scotland), W. B. Russell (West of Scotland),  R. A. Ker (Glasgow University), T. Morrison (Glasgow University), D. Y. Cassels (Glasgow University), W. Morton (St. Vincent)

English matches

No other District matches played.

International matches

No touring matches this season.

References

1876–77 in Scottish rugby union
Scottish Districts seasons